Oreina cacaliae is a species of broad-shouldered leaf beetles belonging to the family Chrysomelidae, subfamily Chrysomelinae.

Subspecies
 Oreina cacaliae albanica (Müller G., 1948) 
 Oreina cacaliae barii (Schatzmayr, 1943) 
 Oreina cacaliae bohemica (Weise, 1889) 
 Oreina cacaliae cacaliae (Schrank, 1785) 
 Oreina cacaliae dinarica (Apfelbeck, 1912) 
 Oreina cacaliae magistrettii (Schatzmayr, 1941) 
 Oreina cacaliae marani (Fassati, 1961) 
 Oreina cacaliae senecionis (Schummel, 1843) 
 Oreina cacaliae senilis (K. Daniel, 1903) 
 Oreina cacaliae tristis (Fabricius, 1792)

Description
Elytra are bright metallic bluish or greenish, with darker longitudinal stripes. The main host plants are Adenostyles alliariae and Petasites paradoxus.

Distribution
This broad-shouldered leaf beetle can be found in Europe (Alps, Sudetes, Carpathian Mountains).

Habitat

References
 Biolib
 Fauna Europaea
 Kalberer NM, Turlings TC, Rahier M. Attraction of a leaf beetle (Oreina cacaliae) to damaged host plants

External links
 Chrysomelidae of Europe
 Insects.ch

Chrysomelinae
Beetles of Europe
Beetles described in 1785